St Nicholas Church is a parish church in the Church of England in the centre of the Norfolk town of North Walsham. The building is a well known landmark, notable for its collapsed tower.

History 

The present church was commenced in about 1330, although the Saxon church was partially enlarged and altered in around 1275, as a temporary measure to meet the needs of a rapidly expanding town. Work was interrupted by the 'Black Death' plague in 1348 and again in 1361. These fatal epidemics resulted in a lack of skilled craftsmen, a fact which necessitated the austere simple tracery in most of the windows. There was another delay at the time of the Peasants' Revolt in 1381, following the Battle of North Walsham, when a large group of rebellious local peasants was confronted and defeated by the heavily armed forces led by the warlike bishop of Norwich, Henry le Despenser. The completed church was consecrated by le Despenser by the end of the fourteenth century.

The church was dedicated to the Blessed Virgin Mary, the change to St. Nicholas only happening in later years after the English Reformation. The pinnacled entrance porch is richly carved and decorated with colourful statues and heraldic emblems. During the medieval period the south chapel area of the church contained a shrine to Thomas Becket, popular with pilgrims en route to Bromholm Priory at Bacton.

The building is one of Britain's largest parish churches and contains many unusual features and artifacts which include the intricately carved telescopic baptismal font cover, a massive iron-bound chest with seven locks, medieval misericord seats, remains of a highly decorated parclose screen with an array of painted saints, a unique Communion Table, and the highly ornate marble tomb of Sir William Paston, 1st Baronet, 1528–1610.

Ruined tower 
The ruinous tower is a local landmark and stands to a height of 85 feet. The steeple was one of Norfolk's tallest and attained a height of 147 feet to the parapet, with a lead-covered timber spire to 180 feet. Local folklore suggests that the spire was added as an act of local rivalry after the completion of the 158-feet tower at Cromer. The tower collapsed on the morning of Saturday 16 May 1724 between 9 and 10 o'clock when the entire south-west corner of the structure containing the stairwell failed. The distressed state of the building had been noticed by the Sexton the previous evening when he ascended the tower to wind the clock. That day had seen the bells rung for several hours during the Ascensiontide Fair, which seems to have caused a resonance throughout the structure.

The Vicar Thomas Jeffery noted the catastrophe in the parish register: "Memorandum May 16.  Between nine and ten o'clock in the forenoon on the Sat. fell down the north and south sides of the steeple and no person man woman nor child 'yt we hear of yet getting any mischief thereby.  Thanks to be to God for his goodness therein."

Once open to the elements the building deteriorated further. At 6pm on Wednesday 17 February 1836 heavy gales brought down the north side of the ruin, sending a quake like tremor through the town. The remaining east belfry wall was later dismantled to a reduced height. One large silence chamber window with its distinctive reticulated tracery remains in situ.

The Paston Way (from North Walsham to Cromer) starts at the parish church.

References

Sources

External links
 The Church of England website for St. Nicholas' Church, North Walsham
 The Norfolk Churches article on St Nicholas includes a large number of photographs.

North Walsham, St Nicholas' Church
North Walsham